Ivan Giordani (born August 22, 1973) is an Italian bobsledder who has competed since 2002. His best Bobsleigh World Cup finish was third in the two-man event at Lake Placid in December 2006.

Giordani also finished 19th in the four-man event at the 2007 FIBT World Championships in St. Moritz.

References
FIBT profile

1973 births
Italian male bobsledders
Living people
Place of birth missing (living people)
21st-century Italian people